The Central District of Qaen County is a district (bakhsh) in Qaen County, South Khorasan Province, Iran. At the 2006 census, its population was 62,040, in 16,239 families.  The District has two cities: Qaen and Esfeden.  The District has three rural districts (dehestan): Mahyar Rural District, Pishkuh Rural District, and Qaen Rural District.

References 

Districts of South Khorasan Province
Qaen County